School District 21 may refer to:
 Wheeling Community Consolidated School District 21
 North Wasco County School District 21
 Marsh Valley School District 21